Sweden is home to one of the largest communities of the Mandaean ethnoreligious group, numbering between 10,000-20,000 people (2019). By comparison, there are now only about 3,000 Mandaeans in Iraq. Several thousand Swedish Mandaeans were granted asylum status as refugees from persecution in Iraq and Syria.

History
The first Mandaeans came to Sweden in the 1970s, including the al-Khafaji family who owned a goldsmithing business on Kungsgatan in Stockholm. The first Mandaean religious worship took place in 1997 when a tarmida (Mandaean priest) from the Netherlands was visiting. Following the Iraq War, there was an influx of refugees from Iraq.

Religion
As of 2018, there was a total of 8 tarmidas living in Sweden under the leadership of 2 genzibras (bishop or high priest). One of the genzibras is Salwan Alkhamas.

The first Mandaean place of worship, or mandi, was consecrated in Sandviken in 2003. Most Mandaeans in Sweden live in Scania in the south of the country, and in the Stockholm region, with a growing population of about 1,500 people in Södertälje.

On September 15, 2018, the first purpose built place of worship, Beth Manda Yardna, was consecrated in Dalby, Scania, Sweden.

Organizations
The Mandeiska Sabeiska Samfundet (Mandaean Sabian Society) is the main organization overseeing the Mandaean community in Sweden. In 2003, the Mandeiska Sabeiska Samfundet built Europe's first mandi in Sandviken. It has also built Mandaean cemeteries in Tyresö and in Södertälje.

Demographics

Population
Historical census estimates of the Mandaean population in Sweden based on data from the SST and the Mandeiska Samfundet:
2012: 8,080
2015: 10,000
2016: 17,500 (Routledge)
2018: 9,000 to 11,000 (belonging to 14 clans)
2019: 20,000 (Routledge)
In contrast, Sedrati (2018) estimates that the number of Mandaeans remaining in Iraq and Iran is around 3,000.

Distribution
There are active Mandaean associations in Stockholm, Malmö, Södertälje, Lund, Örebro, Sandviken, Eskilstuna, Landskrona, and Västerås.

See also
Mandaean Australians
Mandaean Americans
Mandaeans in Iraq (Arabic Wikipedia)

References

External links
Iraqi Refugees in Sweden: A Mandaean Priest Speaks, YouTube
Mandaean Refugees are Stuck Between Iraq and a Hard Place, Vice Magazine
Mandaean Sweden, Ustream
The Nasoraeans Mandaeans in Sweden, YouTube

Ethnic groups in Sweden
Mandaeans
Religion in Sweden